Starigrad Fortress is a 15th-century fortress located near Omiš in Split-Dalmatia county, in Dalmatia, Croatia.
 
 
The fortress or Fortica was built during the Croatian–Ottoman wars as a primary defence against the Ottoman Empire. The precipitous fortification is sited on a  ridge above the town Omiš. In the event of attack, its purpose was to provide refuge for local people and be a stronghold where they could retreat to and resist the Turks. 

As the stone fort's defensive strength is derived from the elevation at which it was built, it is a rudimentary defensive structure. A two-storey square tower stands at its highest point, serving as both a lookout post and keep. A simple bastion stands at the opposite end of the fort to cover the approach path and the ridge line. It has an outer barbican to defend the fort's narrow entrance gateway and the gorge below the fort. They enclose an inner bailey that is separated into two distinct levels by the difference in the site's natural rock height. Access between the levels is via a small stone stairway that was once protected by a stone wall and gateway. In event of attack, the fortification's design permits the defenders to fall back to higher ground as each level falls.

See also 
Omiš
Mirabella Fortress (Peovica)

References

Buildings and structures in Split-Dalmatia County
Forts in Croatia
Omiš